The 88th Fighter Training Squadron is part of the 80th Flying Training Wing based at Sheppard Air Force Base, Texas.  It operates Northrop T-38 Talon aircraft conducting flight training.

History

World War II
The 88th flew combat missions in the China Burma India Theater from, 1 October 1943 – 28 April 1945.

Flying training
It conducted undergraduate pilot training for US and allied students from, 1973–1981 and has been part of the Euro-NATO Joint Pilot Training Program since October 1981.

Operations
World War II
 Constituted as the 88th Pursuit Squadron (Interceptor) on 13 January 1942
 Activated on 9 February 1942
 Redesignated 88th Fighter Squadron on 15 May 1942
 Redesignated 88th Fighter Squadron (Single Engine) on 1 July 1942
 Redesignated 88th Fighter Squadron, Single Engine on 28 February 1944
 Inactivated on 3 November 1945
 Redesignated 88th Flying Training Squadron on 25 May 1972
 Activated on 1 Jan 1973
 Redesignated 88th Fighter Training Squadron' on 18 October 2007

Assignments
 80th Fighter Group, 9 February 1942 – 3 November 1945
 80th Flying Training Wing, 1 January 1973
 80th Operations Group, 2 January 1988 – present

Stations

 Selfridge Field, Michigan, 9 February 1942
 Bridgeport Army Air Field, Connecticut, 25 June 1942
 Farmingdale, New York, 2 September 1942
 Mitchel Field, New York, 9 March – 30 April 1943
 Karachi, India, 28 June 1943
 Guskhara Airfield, India, c. 16 August 1943
 Nagaghuli Airfield, India, 15 October 1943

 Mokelbari, India, c. October 1943
 Shingbwiyang, Burma, 3 May 1944 (detachment operated from Myitkyina, Burma, May – 20 August 1944)
 Myitkyina, Burma, c. 23 January 1945
 Moran, India, 3 May 1945
 Dudhkundi Airfield, India, 29 May – 6 October 1945
 Camp Kilmer, New Jersey, 1 – 3 November 1945
 Sheppard Air Force Base, Texas, 1 January 1973 – present)

Aircraft
Republic P-47 Thunderbolt (1942–1943, 1944–1945)
Curtiss P-40 Warhawk (1943–1944)
Cessna T-37 Tweet (1973–1993)
Northrop T-38 Talon (1981 – present)

References
 Notes

Bibliography

External links
80th Flying Training Wing Heritage Pamphlet
Euro-NATO Joint Jet Pilot Training (ENJJPT) Program Fact Sheet

See also

Military units and formations in Texas
0088
088